The Mornington railway line, in Melbourne, Australia, was a rural railway branching off from the Stony Point railway line at Baxter. The line had a life of 92 years, opening in 1889, and closing in 1981.

History

Opening
A branch was opened of the Gippsland Railway from Caulfield to Mordialloc in 1881 and Frankston in 1882.  This line was extended to Baxter in 1888 and branches were opened to Hastings and Mornington in 1889. The line from Baxter to Mornington was officially opened on 10 September 1889.

When opened, the line had two stations: the terminus of Mornington and intermediate station Moorooduc. Between 1920 and 1930, Rail Motor Stopping Place (RMSP) 16 was opened at Nepean Highway (known as Point Nepean Road at the time) in Mornington, closing again by 1940. Between 1930 and 1940, Mornington Racecourse station was opened on the Melbourne side of RMSP 16, approximately halfway to Moorooduc. Between 1960 and 1970, Mornington Racecourse was renamed to Tanti Park, and between 1970 and 1980 RMSP 16 was reopened. RMSP 16 had 2 small passenger platforms, one on each side of Nepean Highway. The Nepean Highway level crossing was fitted with flashing light signals in 1939, which replaced a Wig Wag signal at the location.

Closure
The passenger service was cancelled during World War II, being reinstated between Frankston and Mornington in September 1966. There were a number of proposals to end the passenger service in the late 1970s. In 1978, people protested against repairs along the line and a replacement bus service was established. The regular DERM used on the line was replaced with the Walker railmotor RM22 in November that year. On 10 December 1978, RM22 left Mornington at 7:20pm and returned to Melbourne. The transport minister acceded to local demand, and a rail service, run by RM55, was reinstated on 9 April 1979, running the passenger service for more than two years.

On 29 February 1979, a special race train was introduced, hauled by T388. That was to be the last special train allowed to operate along the line by VicRail. 300 protesters prevented the train from departing, forcing it to remain in Mornington until the following afternoon. 

In the wake of the Lonie Report in 1981, VicRail prepared to abandon many passenger services and close many stations along the Mornington line. The last summer Sunday service to Mornington ran on 19 April 1981. On 16 March, the Association of Railway Enthusiasts (ARE) ran a steam tour to Mornington and Stony Point, which was hauled by K190. That was the last steam train to travel to the original Mornington railway station site. The last rail service to Mornington ran on 20 May, conducted by Brian Higgins using RM55. The last scheduled train departed from Mornington at 1:23 pm that day, but suffered engine problems, requiring the use of a replacement bus service. RM55 was taken to Melbourne after arriving at Frankston on the last service.

On 6 June 1981, a railway enthusiast group ran a special service from Crib Point to HMAS Cerberus, Mornington and Stony Point, using RM59. On 12 June 1981 a Hastings Primary School train ran a return trip from Hastings to Mornington. This was the last train to run between Baxter and the original Mornington station site. Three days later, the Mornington line was officially declared out of service and a new bus timetable was established. The line remained disused until 1989 when the termite infested Mornington station building was abruptly demolished. The line between Nepean Highway and Mornington was removed in 1991 and, in 1999, the infrastructure at Mornington station was demolished, with a shopping centre being erected on the site.

Re-opening
The rest of the line lay idle until 1984 when the Mornington Railway Preservation Society was formed with the long-term ambition of restoring a tourist railway service along the line. They restored a K class Steam Locomotive and in 1991 leased the line between Baxter and Nepean Highway. In 1997, their rolling stock was transferred to the current base at Moorooduc, with tourist trains currently operating along the line connecting Moorooduc and Mornington.

References

Closed Melbourne railway lines
5 ft 3 in gauge railways in Australia
Railway lines opened in 1889
1889 establishments in Australia